Orange Belt may refer to the following:
A level in the Japanese system of classification known as Kyū.
The second outermost road in the Allegheny County belt system.
Orange Belt Railway in Florida